Helen Cunningham (also Richardson) is a fictional character from the British Channel 4 soap opera Hollyoaks, played by Kathryn George. George first appeared in the role in 1997 before the character was written out in 2004 when she was killed in a car accident caused by Milo Entwistle. While on the serial Helen was central to several storylines including a relationship with Gordon Cunningham, dealing with the suicide of her son Lewis Richardson and her daughter Mandy Richardson's abuse at the hands of her husband Dennis Richardson.

Storylines
For much of Helen Cunningham's early time in the Village she had the terrible misfortune of being saddled with a family intent on ripping itself apart. Helen had a tough time whilst she was married to Dennis Richardson (David McAllister), who had been abusive to her and had repeatedly raped their daughter Mandy. Helen was unaware of this until Mandy confessed to her brother Lewis. After Dennis was sent to prison for seven years, Helen found a new love interest in Gordon Cunningham (Bernard Latham). The pair slept together and Helen was shocked to realise that she was pregnant. Gordon did the honourable thing by asking her to marry him. They soon got married and Helen gave birth to baby Tom Cunningham (Ellis Hollins), but more tragedy came for Helen when she found out Lewis had attempted suicide and was slowly dying. This left Helen devastated and she found it hard to cope.

Due to Lewis's death, the relationship between Helen and Mandy fell apart and the pair barely spoke to each other. After a while, however, the pair began to rebuild their relationship. Helen then enjoyed a period of happiness running the ironing and cleaning business 'Steam Team' next door to Gordon's Drive 'n' Buy whilst raising Tom. Then suddenly, for reasons best known to herself, Helen became restless: her shop changed its identity, and so did she, indulging in an affair with Tony, Gordon's friend. This was eventually exposed when an earthquake destroyed the barge the lovesick pair had chosen as a bolt hole. After much argument, Tony told Helen that he did not want to be with her any longer and that she should get back with Gordon for Tom and Mandy's sake. Helen took Tony's advice and she and Gordon were fully reconciled.

Helen began to regain the respect of daughter Mandy and stepson Max Cunningham (Matt Littler), but soon things were back on rocky ground for her when husband Gordon had a death scare, suffering a heart attack. Helen blamed herself, but Max supported her and Gordon seemed to recover. However a week later, lightning struck twice when Gordon, Helen and Tom were involved in a car accident that left Gordon dead after he suffered another heart attack. Helen was devastated and although she returned home from the hospital, she later died in her sleep whilst sitting in a chair with a blanket over her legs. This left Tom, who survived the crash, an orphan. According to Helen's will, Tom was supposed to stay with Mandy. He then lived with his brother Max for four years until Max died when he was run over on his wedding day, and his widow wife Steph Dean begins to take care of Tom until her death in 2010. In 2012, her tombstone was briefly seen when Cindy Hutchinson went to mourn for Rhys Ashworth.

In 2018, the Cunninghams discover that Milo Entwistle is responsible for the deaths of Gordon and Helen.

Development
Helen's son Lewis (Ben Hull) commits suicide. This damages her relationship with daughter Mandy (Sarah Jayne Dunn). Dunn said having to film scenes where Helen and Mandy argue were "horrid". In scenes where Helen hits Mandy, Dunn said she trusted George enough to allow her to hit her "for real" as it would add to realism. George added that Dunn and herself "get on well" and added that if she had children she would "want a daughter just like Sarah".

Helen has a brief affair with Tony Hutchinson (Nick Pickard). Pickard said the storyline "shocked" him. Pickard later added that his character was "going out with the old lady at the moment". Pickard added that he "gets on well with Kathryn" but that it was "weird when you suddenly have to be necking her". Pickard added that they "just got on with it" although it was "embarrassing when there's a cut and you don't really know what to say to each other".

The Liverpool Daily Post called the character a "temptress".

References

Hollyoaks characters
Television characters introduced in 1997
Cunningham family
Female characters in television